Tingena xanthodesma is a species of moth in the family Oecophoridae. It is endemic to New Zealand and has been observed in Southland, the Otago region, and on Kapiti Island. This species inhabits native forest and is on the wing from November to February.

Taxonomy
This species was first described by in 1923 by Alfred Philpott using specimens collected in Otago and named Borkhausenia xanthodesma.  George Hudson discussed this species as a synonym of Borkhausenia compsogramma in his 1928 publication The butterflies and moths of New Zealand. In 1926 Philpott discussed this species under the name B. xanthodesma and separated it from B. compsogramma based on  differences in the male genitalia of these two species. In 1988 J. S. Dugdale confirmed this separation based on both the pattern colour differences between the two species as well as difference in the genitalia and placed this species within the genus Tingena.  The male holotype specimen, collected at Tisbury in Southland, is held at the New Zealand Arthropod Collection.

Description 
Philpott described this species as follows:
Philpott states that a form of this species can be found in the Hunter Mountains where the fasciae are tinged an orange red colour.

Distribution 
This species is endemic to New Zealand. It has been observed in Southland, Otago including in Dunedin and a specimen has also been collected on Kapiti Island.

Behaviour 
The adults of this species are on the wing from November to February.

Habitat 
This species inhabits native forest.

References

Oecophoridae
Moths of New Zealand
Moths described in 1923
Endemic fauna of New Zealand
Taxa named by Alfred Philpott
Endemic moths of New Zealand